Estradiol/levonorgestrel (E2/LNG), sold under brand name Climara Pro, is a combination of estradiol (E2) and levonorgestrel (LNG) which is used in menopausal hormone therapy. It is a 22-cm2 transdermal patch containing 4.4 mg estradiol and 1.39 mg levonorgestrel and delivers 45 μg/day estradiol and 15 μg/day levonorgestrel. E2/LNG was approved for medical use in the United States in 2003.

See also 
 Estradiol/norethisterone acetate
 Ethinylestradiol/norelgestromin
 List of combined sex-hormonal preparations

References 

Combined estrogen–progestogen formulations
Transdermal patches